Benjamin Lee Spendlove (born 4 November 1978) is an English cricketer who played for Derbyshire between 1997 and 2001.

Spendlove was born in Belper, Derbyshire. He made his debut for Derbyshire in the 1997 season. He left the side in 2001 but after good performances in the local leagues in the ensuing years, started playing for the club again in the one day game, rejoining the side for the last six games of 2004.

He occasionally played as a substitute fielder for the England Cricket Team, during Test matches at Trent Bridge, Nottingham.

With his innings limited in 2004 and 2005, to a combined total of only eight, garnering a total of 46 runs, and having been demoted to the Second XI, he left with a year remaining on his contract, being selected merely at the time on the strength of his off-breaks rather than on his batting prowess. He is a right-handed batsman and a right-arm offbreak bowler.

After the breakdown of his relationship with Elaine Gardiner in 2006, he left the sport professionally to peruse an interest on the hospitality industry.

External links
Ben Spendlove at Cricket Archive 

1978 births
Living people
English cricketers
Derbyshire cricketers
NBC Denis Compton Award recipients
Derbyshire Cricket Board cricketers
Cheshire cricketers
People from Belper
Cricketers from Derbyshire
People educated at Trent College